Alon Carl Wieland (April 26, 1935 – January 22, 2022) was an American politician in the state of North Dakota. He was a member of the North Dakota House of Representatives, from 2002 to 2014. representing the 13th district. A Republican, he was first elected in 2002. An alumnus of North Dakota State University (BA, MA), he was a former commissioner of Cass County, North Dakota from 1983 to 2003, member of the Cass County Social Service Board, and former president of the North Dakota County Commissioners Association. Wieland died at Sheyenne Crossings in West Fargo, North Dakota, on January 22, 2022, at the age of 86.

References

1935 births
2022 deaths
21st-century American politicians
County commissioners in North Dakota
Republican Party members of the North Dakota House of Representatives
North Dakota State University alumni
Businesspeople from North Dakota
People from McLean County, North Dakota
People from West Fargo, North Dakota